The Rotax 377 is a , twin-cylinder, two-stroke aircraft engine, that was built by BRP-Rotax GmbH & Co. KG of Austria for use in ultralight aircraft.

Development

The Rotax 377 features piston-ported, air-cooled cylinder heads and cylinders, utilizing either a fan or free air for cooling. Lubrication is by use of pre-mixed fuel and oil. The 377 has a single Bosch Flywheel Magneto Generator 12 volt ignition system and is equipped with a 36 mm Bing double float carburetor, with either a hand lever or cable choke.

The Rotax 377 is no longer in production.

Applications

Specifications (377)

See also

References

Air-cooled aircraft piston engines
Rotax engines
Two-stroke aircraft piston engines